This is a list of countries by total renewable water resources mostly based on The World Factbook. This entry provides the long-term average water availability for a country in cubic kilometers from precipitation, groundwater recharge, and surface inflows from surrounding countries. Fresh and unpolluted water accounts for 0.003% of total water available globally.

Water resources 

Out of all the water on Earth, saline water in oceans, seas and saline groundwater make up about 97% of it. Only 2.5–2.75% is fresh water, including 1.75–2% frozen in glaciers, ice and snow, 0.5–0.75% as fresh groundwater and soil moisture, and less than 0.01% of it as surface water in lakes, swamps and rivers. Freshwater lakes contain about 87% of this fresh surface water, including 29% in the African Great Lakes, 22% in Lake Baikal in Russia, 21% in the North American Great Lakes, and 14% in other lakes. Swamps have most of the balance with only a small amount in rivers, most notably the Amazon River. The atmosphere contains 0.04% water. In areas with no fresh water on the ground surface, fresh water derived from precipitation may, because of its lower density, overlie saline ground water in lenses or layers. Most of the world's fresh water is frozen in ice sheets. Many areas suffer from lack of distribution of fresh water, such as deserts.

Total Renewable Internal Freshwater Resources 
According to the Index Mundi’s data, Greenland ranked number 1 and Iceland number 2 in renewable internal freshwater resources per capita with 10,662,190.00 cubic meters and 519,264.70 cubic meters, respectively. Renewable internal freshwater resources per capita are calculated using the World Bank's population estimates.

Average annual renewable freshwater supply by country

The following table is an average annual renewable freshwater supply by country including both surface-water and groundwater supplies. This table represents data from the UN FAO AQUASTAT, much of which are produced by modeling or estimation as opposed to actual measurements.

See also
 List of countries by freshwater withdrawal
 List of rivers by discharge
 List of largest unfragmented rivers

References

Water, renewable
Water resources management